Paynter's Cross is a hamlet on the A388 main road southeast of St Mellion in southeast Cornwall, England, UK.

References

Hamlets in Cornwall